Sergey Kudrevich (born 6 August 1967) is a Belarusian diver. He competed in the men's 10 metre platform event at the 1996 Summer Olympics.

References

1967 births
Living people
Belarusian male divers
Olympic divers of Belarus
Divers at the 1996 Summer Olympics
Sportspeople from Minsk